Harry Bains is a Canadian politician serving as the Minister of Labour in British Columbia. He has been the NDP MLA for Surrey-Newton since 2005.

Career 
Bains has experience in education due to his service on the Kwantlen University College Board of Governors as board member and vice chair from 1993 and 1999. He has also volunteered with Habitat for Humanity.

Bains was an elected officer of Steelworkers-IWA Canada Local 2171 for over fifteen years. He has served most recently as full-time vice president of his local chapter, in which he led negotiations and helped in bargaining to improve workers wages and working conditions.

Critic roles 
Bains served as opposition critic for the 2010 winter Olympic Games,Transportation and Infrastructure, forestry. Bains also served as Jobs, Employment, Labour and Worksafe BC Critic in the NDP shadow cabinet.

Election results

Personal life 
Bains and his wife Rajvinder live in Surrey with their two children. He is an advocate for workers' rights and equality.

References 

British Columbia New Democratic Party MLAs
Canadian Sikhs
Year of birth missing (living people)
Living people
Members of the Executive Council of British Columbia
Punjabi people
United Steelworkers people
Canadian politicians of Indian descent
People from Surrey, British Columbia
21st-century Canadian politicians
International Woodworkers of America people